Cleomella angustifolia, the narrowleaf rhombopod, is a plant species native to the south-central United States. It grows in roadsides, grasslands, stream banks, and pond shores in Texas, Oklahoma, Kansas, Nebraska and Colorado.

Cleomella angustifolia is an herb up to 200 cm tall. Leaves are pinnately compound with 3-8 pairs of leaflets. Flowers are yellow-orange, up to 15 mm across. Capsules are rhomboidal, up to 12 mm across.

References

angustifolia
Flora of Nebraska
Flora of Oklahoma
Flora of Colorado
Flora of Texas
Flora of Kansas
Plants described in 1850
Flora without expected TNC conservation status